Amorbia catarina is a species of moth of the family Tortricidae. It is found in southern Brazil and Trinidad.

The length of the forewings is 8.5–8.9 mm. The ground colour of the forewings is brown with the basal, median, subterminal fasciae and apex darker. The hindwings are pale brown. Adults have been recorded on wing in February, July, November and December.

Etymology
The species name refers to the state of the type locality, Santa Catarina in Brazil.

References

Moths described in 2007
Sparganothini
Moths of the Caribbean
Moths of South America